In geometry, the pentagonal prism is a prism with a pentagonal base. It is a type of heptahedron with seven faces, fifteen edges, and ten vertices.

As a semiregular (or uniform) polyhedron 

If faces are all regular, the pentagonal prism is a semiregular polyhedron, more generally, a uniform polyhedron, and the third in an infinite set of prisms formed by square sides and two regular polygon caps. It can be seen as a truncated pentagonal hosohedron, represented by Schläfli symbol t{2,5}. Alternately it can be seen as the Cartesian product of a regular pentagon and a line segment, and represented by the product {5}×{}. The dual of a pentagonal prism is a pentagonal bipyramid.

The symmetry group of a right pentagonal prism is D5h of order 20. The rotation group is D5 of order 10.

Volume
The volume, as for all prisms, is the product of the area of the pentagonal base times the height or distance along any edge perpendicular to the base. For a uniform pentagonal prism with edges h the formula is

Use 
Nonuniform pentagonal prisms called pentaprisms are also used in optics to rotate an image through a right angle without changing its chirality.

In 4-polytopes 
It exists as cells of four nonprismatic uniform 4-polytopes in four dimensions:

Related polyhedra

External links 
 
Pentagonal Prism Polyhedron Model -- works in your web browser

Prismatoid polyhedra